Marie von Kleist (1761–1831) was a German courtier. She served as lady-in-waiting to Queen Louise of Mecklenburg-Strelitz. She was the close confidante and favorite of the queen, and is also known as the benefactor of her cousin Heinrich von Kleist.

References

 Hedwig Abeken (Hrsg.): Hedwig von Olfers, geb. v. Staegemann 1799–1891. Ein Lebenslauf, Bd. 1: Elternhaus und Jugend 1799–1815., Mittler und Sohn, Berlin 1908; Bd. 2: Erblüht in der Romantik, gereift in selbstloser Liebe. Aus Briefen zusammengestellt. 1816–1891, Mittler und Sohn, Berlin 1914

1761 births
1831 deaths
German ladies-in-waiting
Heinrich von Kleist
German salon-holders